Fire Fighter is a fireboat which served the New York City Fire Department from 1938 through 2010, serving with Marine Companies 1, 8 and 9 during her career.

Service history
Authorized for construction in early 1937 by Mayor Fiorello LaGuardia based on designs submitted by noted naval architect William Francis Gibbs and his firm Gibbs & Cox, Fire Fighter was laid down at United Shipyards as Hull #856 and was christened and launched on August 28, 1938, by Eleanor Grace Flanagan. After fitting out and sea trials, Fire Fighter officially entered service with the New York City Fire Department at 9:00 a.m. on November 16, 1938, with Engine 57 at Pier 1 at the Battery, which would later be organized as Marine Unit 1.

Shifting with the majority of commercial steamship line freight operations from Manhattan to the Brooklyn waterfront, Fire Fighter served with Marine Unit 8 and Engine 223 at the 37th Street Pier through 1967 before shifting once again to the Homeport Pier in Stapleton where she joined Marine Unit 9, an assignment which made her the first-due marine firefighting asset at the heavily trafficked Narrows of New York Harbor and throughout the tight confines of both the Arthur Kill and Kill van Kull. With both waterways already heavily utilized by marine traffic calling at ports on the Chemical Coast, the rise of both the Port Newark-Elizabeth Marine Terminal and Howland Hook Marine Terminal saw an increasing number of container ships transiting the same waters. These conditions led to several major vessel collisions and shoreside fires during her tenure in Staten Island, but the 1973 collision of SS Esso Brussels and SS Sea Witch would prove to be the largest fires she would ever fight single-handedly. For her and her crew's part in the response, firefighting and rescue of 31 surviving crewmen from the burning SS Sea Witch, the Fire Fighter was named a Gallant Ship and her crew received the American Merchant Marine Seamanship Trophy. To date, Fire Fighter remains the only fireboat to have received this award.

A 1974 article in The New York Times described how fires in New Jersey frequently resulted in requests to the FDNY commissioner for the loan of Fire Fighter.  Once authorized it would take Fire Fighter approximately 45 minutes to arrive at waterfront communities such as Carteret.

The boat, as Firefighter, was declared a U.S. National Historic Landmark in 1989.

On September 11, 2001, Fire Fighter, along with the rest of the FDNY Marine Units, responded to the terrorist attack on the World Trade Center and took up a station at the foot of Albany Street in Battery Park City and began pumping at her maximum capacity to supply water to landside units fighting fires in the still-standing towers. Following the collapse of both buildings and resultant failure of the majority of the water mains serving lower Manhattan, Fire Fighter and the rest of the FDNY Marine Units became the sole source of water for firefighting efforts at Ground Zero, a duty which Fire Fighter maintained for a period of three weeks until sufficient repairs were completed on landside water mains to permit her release from what had become her longest emergency response call. Following a shipyard period in 2003 to rebuild her worn-out engines, the Fire Fighter resumed her post and continued to respond to marine emergencies, including a gasoline barge explosion in Port Mobil, Staten Island, in February 2003, and to the ditching of US Airways Flight 1549 on the Hudson River in 2009.

Replaced in frontline service by the fireboat Fire Fighter II, in 2010 at Marine Unit 9, Fire Fighter was placed into reserve status at the former Brooklyn Navy Yard where she remained in FDNY custody until October 15, 2012. Transferred on that date to the ownership of the non-profit Fireboat Fire Fighter Museum, Fire Fighter is now operated by an all-volunteer group dedicated to preserving the historic fireboat in running condition as a museum ship, befitting her over 70 years of service to the people and mariners of New York City and New York Harbor.

As a museum ship
Under the stewardship of the museum, Fire Fighter found a home in Greenport, New York on Long Island's North Fork and relocated to the village from the Brooklyn Navy Yard in February 2013. Eventually shifting to the village's commercial pier in accordance with their contractual agreement with the village, the museum has continued to grow in popularity and was granted 501(c)3 status by the IRS in October 2013 as a tax-exempt non-profit organization. The museum was awarded a National Park Service Maritime Heritage Grant in 2014 to pursue hull upkeep and preventative maintenance shipyard work.

Gathering matching funds for the National Park Service grant lasted through December 2016, when Fire Fighter reported to Goodison Shipyard in Kingston, Rhode Island, for four months of shipyard work, overhaul and hull inspection. Completed in April 2017, Fire Fighter returned to Greenport, New York in her as-built, late 1930 FDNY color scheme, with a black hull, white topsides and buff smokestack, and with all topside brass returned to its bare metal appearance. As of the summer of 2021, the vessel is currently on exhibit at the Mystic Seaport Museum in Mystic, CT.

Photo gallery

References

External links 

 Museum Website
 Official Greenport Village Website 
 Marine 9
 "Fire Fighter" Youtube video of 2003 rechristening and operation on the water
 Information about Fire Fighter's Winton diesel engines on Old Tacoma Marine Inc.

National Register of Historic Places in Suffolk County, New York
Southold, New York
Ships on the National Register of Historic Places in New York (state)
National Historic Landmarks in New York (state)
Fireboats of New York City
1938 ships
Museum ships in New York (state)
Ships built in Staten Island